Rothia cruenta is a moth of the family Noctuidae. This moth occurs in Madagascar.

References
Jordan, K. 1913. In Seitz: Die Gross-Schmetterlinge der Erde. - — 15.

Agaristinae
Moths of Madagascar
Moths of Africa
Moths described in 1913